Tor Richter (20 April 1938 – 30 September 2010) was a Norwegian sports shooter. He competed in the 50 metre rifle, prone event at the 1960 Summer Olympics.

References

External links
 

1938 births
2010 deaths
Norwegian male sport shooters
Olympic shooters of Norway
Shooters at the 1960 Summer Olympics
People from Stjørdal
Sportspeople from Trøndelag
20th-century Norwegian people